The Brandon Bridge Formation is a geologic formation in Wisconsin. It preserves fossils dating back to the Silurian period, including those of  graptolites, conodonts and Parioscorpio.

See also

 List of fossiliferous stratigraphic units in Wisconsin
 Paleontology in Wisconsin
 Waukesha Biota

References

Silurian geology of Wisconsin
Silurian southern paleotropical deposits
Lagerstätten